Conus monilifer is a species of sea snail, a marine gastropod mollusk in the family Conidae, the cone snails and their allies.

Like all species within the genus Conus, these snails are predatory and venomous. They are capable of "stinging" humans, therefore live ones should be handled carefully or not at all.

Description
The size of the shell varies between 35 mm and 50 mm.

Distribution
This marine species occurs off Ecuador.

References

  Adams A. (1855). Description of two new genera and several new species of Mollusca, from the collection of Hugh Cuming, Esq. Proceedings of the Zoological Society of London, 23: 119–124
  Puillandre N., Duda T.F., Meyer C., Olivera B.M. & Bouchet P. (2015). One, four or 100 genera? A new classification of the cone snails. Journal of Molluscan Studies. 81: 1–23

External links
 The Conus Biodiversity website
 

monilifer
Gastropods described in 1833
Taxa named by William Broderip